Lautaro Nicolás Comas (born January 15, 1995) is an Argentine footballer who plays as a forward or attacking midfielder for Paraguayan club Guaireña, on loan from Argentine Primera División club Patronato.

Career
Comas came through the youth system of hometown club Patronato, and made his senior debut on October 6, 2013, replacing José Luis García after 55 minutes of a Primera B Nacional match at home to Villa San Carlos with his team 2–1 down. Within two minutes of entering the match, Comas crossed for Walter Andrade's equalising goal. He ended the season with 23 league appearances and 4 goals.

Comas played in 14 matches in the 2015 regular season and another 4 in the play-offs, as Patronato beat Santamarina on penalties to gain promotion to the top flight for the second time in their historytheir only previous appearance was in 1978 under a very different system. He started Patronato's first match in the 2016 Primera División, at home to San Lorenzo on February 6, and supplied the assist for Patronato's second goal in a 2–2 draw. Comas appeared less than he might have hoped in the Primera, and towards the end of the 2016–17 season, speculation arose about a possible move abroad.

In July 2017, Comas extended his contract with Patronato to June 2020, and then joined Chilean Primera División club O'Higgins on loan, with an option to purchase at the end of the 2018 season. In January 2022, Comas joined Paraguayan club Guaireña on a one-year loan deal with a purchase option.

Personal life
Comas was born in Paraná, in the Entre Ríos Province of Argentina. His brother, Román, is also a professional footballer.

References

1995 births
Living people
People from Paraná, Entre Ríos
Argentine footballers
Argentine expatriate footballers
Association football forwards
Club Atlético Patronato footballers
O'Higgins F.C. footballers
Primera Nacional players
Argentine Primera División players
Paraguayan Primera División players
Argentine expatriate sportspeople in Chile
Argentine expatriate sportspeople in Paraguay
Expatriate footballers in Chile
Expatriate footballers in Paraguay
Sportspeople from Entre Ríos Province